Shree Birendra Hospital (श्री विरेन्द्र अस्पताल) originally Birendra Sainik Hospital (विरेन्द्र शैनिक अस्पताल)is an army hospital established in 1990 and run by Nepal Army. The hospital is located in Chhauni, Kathmandu. Initially, the hospital was open to army personnel, retired army personnel and their family only. From 2017, the hospital also started outpatient service for civilians. The hospital has a plan to upgrade to 900 beds to cater for civilians. In 2020, the hospital also started providing free hemodialysis service to the civilians.

It is also a teaching hospital for postgraduate teaching program run by Nepal Army Institute of Health Science. This hospital is under the command of Nepal Army Medical Corps (NAMC) under the Director-General of Medical Services of Nepal Army Headquarters.

The hospital also publishes its own medical journal named Journal of Shree Birendra Hospital.

Notable Events
 The late king Birendra and other members of the Royal Family were treated in this hospital after the Nepalese royal massacre.

Facilities
Pediatrics
Psychiatry
Dermatology, Venereology and Leprosy
Surgery
Orthopedics
Oto-rhinolaryngology
Ophthalmology
Obstetrics and Gynecology
Dental Surgery
Physical and Rehabilitation Medicine Centre

See also
Tri Chandra military Hospital

References

External links
Medical Journal of Shree Birendra Hospital
Official website

Hospitals in Nepal
1990 establishments in Nepal